Roblinella agnewi is a species of small land snail in the family Charopidae. This species is endemic to Tasmania in Australia, where it is known only from Mount Wellington. It is known commonly as the silky snail.

This snail is poorly known. It has only been found at a few sites on a single mountain, a distribution that may represent a single population. It is small and hard to locate, so it is possible it may occur on other mountains nearby, but focused searches have failed to turn up specimens anywhere else.

This species lives in shrubby mountain forest habitat in the subalpine zone. It has been found in open boulder fields in patches of wet vegetation. These mountain slopes are susceptible to bushfires, one threat to what may be the single remaining population of this snail.

References

Gastropods of Australia
Roblinella
Vulnerable fauna of Australia
Gastropods described in 1879
Taxonomy articles created by Polbot